Woroba District is one of 14 administrative districts of Ivory Coast. It is in the northeast part of the country. Its capital is Séguéla.

Creation
Woroba District was created in a 2011 administrative reorganisation of the subdivisions of Ivory Coast. The territory of the district was composed by merging the regions of Bafing and Worodougou.

Administrative divisions
Woroba District is currently subdivided into three regions and the following departments:
 Bafing Region (region seat in Touba)
 Koro Department
 Touba Department
 Ouaninou Department
 Béré Region (region seat in Mankono)
 Kounahiri Department
 Mankono Department
 Dianra Department
 Worodougou Region (region seat also in Séguéla)
 Séguéla Department
 Kani Department

Population
According to the 2021 census, Woroba District has a population of 1,184,813, making it the third least populous district in Ivory Coast, behind Yamoussoukro Autonomous District and Denguélé District.

References

 
Districts of Ivory Coast
States and territories established in 2011